Prepona is a genus of Neotropical charaxine butterflies in the family Nymphalidae. They are strong fliers in tropical forests where they feed on fermenting fruits and animal dung. The underside of the wings is pale greyish or brownish, while the upperside is dark with distinct iridescent blue markings. A few species also have orange markings on the upperside of the wings. They are popular among butterfly collectors.

Prepona deiphile is considered a threatened species in Minas Gerais state, Brazil.

Description

"They are very robust insects, measuring four inches across the wings, which are broad and dentated, with the tip of the fore-wings much produced, but not falcate, the hind-margin being oblique and then nearly straight below; near the inner-margin of the hind-wings of the males stands a yellow tuft of stiff hair (androconial tuft), as in Agrias. The wings are black, and are generally crossed by a broad blue or greenish-blue band, often interrupted below the costa of the fore-wings. In some species the whole of the wings is suffused with rich purple; in others the blue band is confined to the hind-wings, and is reduced to a blue blotch. The most beautiful species is P. praeneste, Hewitson, from New Granada, which might easily be mistaken for an Agrias, but for the much broader fore-wings with the hind-margin concave. It is black, suffused with rich purple, and with a sub-marginal row of scarlet spots. From the base of the fore-wings runs a scarlet band, narrowly continued along the costa for three-fourths of its length, but, beyond the cell, continued in a broad curve to the band of spots at a point opposite the middle of the hind-margin. On the under side the Preponas are varied with different shades of brown and grey; sometimes there is a transverse black or white line, and very frequently a number of short irregular zig-zag lines towards the base. On the hind-wings beneath there is either a sub-marginal row of small eyes between the nervures, or two larger eyes, one towards the tip, and the other towards the anal angle; the latter is sometimes visible above. The larva and pupa resemble those of Apatura; and notwithstanding the strong and rapid flight of the Butterflies, they are not difficult to capture, as they have the habit of settling on projecting branches of trees, and are not easily alarmed". Description from William Forsell Kirby's A Hand-book to the Order Lepidoptera (1896).

The smooth, hairless larvae have a prominent thoracic hump which may be expanded to expose false eyespots. The colour is variously dark brown and pale brown. The head bears a pair of stout recurved horns and there is a bifid tail. The pupa is green or bluish green with irregular white spots resembling lichen. It is an ovoid shape with a prominent thoracic bulge. It is suspended by the cremaster from a leaf or twig.

Habitat
Rainforests.

Taxonomy 
The members of the genus Archaeoprepona were formerly also included in Prepona. Species included in Prepona:

 Prepona Boisduval, 1836
 Prepona deiphile (Godart, [1824])
 Prepona dexamenus Hopffer, 1874 – Dexamenus prepona
 Prepona laertes (Hübner, 1811) – shaded-blue leafwing or Laertes prepona
 Prepona pheridamas (Cramer, 1777) – pheridamas prepona
 Prepona praeneste Hewitson, 1859
 Prepona pylene Hewitson, 1853 – narrow-banded shoemaker or pylene prepona
 Prepona werneri Hering & Hopp, 1925

Systematics

Clade showing phylogenetics of Prepona.

See also
Archaeoprepona (sister genus). Many Archaeoprepona species were formerly placed in Prepona.

References

 Le Moult, Eugène (1932). Etudes sur les Prepona: lépidoptères rhopalocères américains E. Le Moult, Novitates Entomologicae, 1932–1933.
 Feltwell, John (1993). The Encyclopedia of Butterflies Great Britain: Prentice Hall General Reference.
 Furtado, E. (2008). Intergeneric hybridism between Prepona and Agrias (Lepidoptera: Nymphalidae, Charaxinae). Tropical Lepidoptera Research 18(1): 5–6. pdf
 Muyshondt, Alberto (1973). Notes on the life cycle and natural history of butterflies of El Salvador. I. Prepona omphale octavia (Nymphalidae) Journal of the Lepidopterists' Society 27 :210-219. pdf

External links

BOA Photographs of type specimens.
"Prepona Boisduval, [1836]" at Markku Savela's Lepidoptera and Some Other Life Forms
Prepona images at EOL
Nymphalidae Systematics Group
Tree of Life web project: Prepona
Barcode of Life Includes images
Pteron Images. In Japanese but with binomial names (Latin)
Prepona Info Photographs
Eugene Le Moult's Prepona types
Janzen photos of larvae and pupae. Via search Prepona + caterpillars

Charaxinae
Nymphalidae of South America
Nymphalidae genera
Taxa named by Jean Baptiste Boisduval